Cyclopinidae is a family of copepods belonging to the order Cyclopoida.

Genera

Genera:
 Afrocyclopina Wells, 1967
 Allocyclopina Kiefer, 1954
 Arenocyclopina Krishnaswamy, 1957

References

Copepods